SS Linda was an Estonian Cargo Ship that was torpedoed by U-9 in the North Sea  west of Utsira, Norway, while she was travelling from Blyth, United Kingdom to Göteborg, Sweden.

Construction 
Linda was constructed in 1899 at the Ailsa Shipbuilding Co. Ltd. shipyard in Troon, Scotland. She had a triple expansion engine driving a single screw propeller and one boiler. The engine was rated at 137 nhp.

Sinking 
She broke in two and her forepart sank immediately, the stern followed four minutes later. One person was killed, the 14 survivors were rescued by SS Birgitta .

References 

Steamships of Estonia
Ships built in Scotland
1899 ships
Ships sunk by German submarines in World War II
World War II shipwrecks in the North Sea
Cargo ships
Maritime incidents in February 1940